Predictable may refer to:

Something which shows predictability
"Predictable" (Delta Goodrem song), 2003
"Predictable" (Good Charlotte song), 2004
"Predictable" (The Kinks song), 1981
"Predictable", a song by The Mr. T Experience from their 1988 album Night Shift at the Thrill Factory
"Predictable", a song by Avail from their 1992 album Satiate
"Predictable", a song by Korn from their 1993 EP Neidermeyer's Mind, and the eighth song of their 1994 album Korn
"Predictable", a song by Pete Townshend from his 1993 album Psychoderelict

See also 

Prediction (disambiguation)
Predict (disambiguation)